The Eleventh Dynasty of Egypt conventionally starts with the Pharaoh Mentuhotep I and ends with the death of Mentuhotep IV, while the beginning of the Middle Kingdom is marked by the reunification of ancient Egypt under Mentuhotep II. As with many other dynasties, the 11th Dynasty family tree is partially unclear, with many obscure relationships.

References 
 Aidan Dodson & Dyan Hilton, The Complete Royal Families of Ancient Egypt, Thames & Hudson, 2004, pp. 82–89.

Family tree
11